The Seafarer may refer to the following:

The Seafarer (play), a play by Conor McPherson
"The Seafarer" (poem), an Old English poem
The Seafarers, a short film by Stanley Kubrick
The Seafarers (novel), a novel by Nevil Shute
Catan: Seafarers, an expansion of the board game The Settlers of Catan
Seafarer Glacier, Victoria Land, Antarctica

See also
Sailor